James Edward "Sunny Jim" Fitzsimmons (July 23, 1874 – March 11, 1966) was a Thoroughbred racehorse trainer.

Early life
Born in Sheepshead Bay, Brooklyn in 1874, Fitzsimmons began his career in 1885 working at a racetrack as a stable boy. After nearly ten less-than-successful years as a thoroughbred jockey, he became too heavy for that job and took up the training of horses. He went on to have one of the most successful careers in racing history, spanning seventy years from 1894 to 1963 with 2,275 race wins.

Professional career
Known as both "Sunny Jim" and as "Mr. Fitz", he trained three Kentucky Derby winners, four Preakness Stakes winners, and six Belmont Stakes winners. Included were two U.S. Triple Crown champions: Gallant Fox in 1930 and his son Omaha in 1935. Fitzsimmons' total of thirteen Classic wins was broken by D. Wayne Lukas in 2013. Five times, Fitzsimmons was the season's top money-winning trainer.

In 1923, Fitzsimmons took over training at Belair Stud. Following the death of William Woodward, Jr., Belair's owner, in 1955 and the dispersal of its stock, Fitzsimmons continued to train for the Wheatley Stable, where he conditioned Preakness winner and 1957 American Horse of the Year Bold Ruler, who sired Secretariat.

Accolades
In recognition of his accomplishments, in 1958 Fitzsimmons was inducted in the National Museum of Racing and Hall of Fame.

The National Turf Writers Association created an award in his name called the "Mr. Fitz Award" to honor a member of the horse racing fraternity each year.

Death
Sunny Jim Fitzsimmons died in 1966 in Miami. He is buried in the Holy Cross Cemetery, Brooklyn.

Selected wins
Selected other major stakes race wins:
Saratoga Cup: 10
Dwyer Stakes: 9
Lawrence Realization: 8
Alabama Stakes: 8
Suburban Handicap: 5
Withers Stakes: 4

References

Sources
 Breslin, Jimmy Sunny Jim: The life of America's most beloved horseman, James Fitzsimmons (1962) Doubleday & Company, Inc.
 Bowen, Edward L. Masters of the Turf: Ten Trainers Who Dominated Horse Racing's Golden Age (2007) Eclipse Press
 James Fitzsimmons at the United States' National Museum of Racing and Hall of Fame
 James Fitzsimmons and the Kentucky Derby

1874 births
1966 deaths
American horse trainers
Burials at Holy Cross Cemetery, Brooklyn
Fitzsimmons, Sun
United States Thoroughbred Racing Hall of Fame inductees